Deniece Williams (born June Deniece Chandler; June 3, 1951) is an American singer. She has been described as "one of the great soul voices" by the BBC. She is best known for the songs "Free", "Silly", "It's Gonna Take a Miracle" and two Billboard Hot 100 No.1 singles "Let's Hear It for the Boy" and "Too Much, Too Little, Too Late" (with Johnny Mathis).  Williams has won four Grammys with twelve nominations altogether. She (with Johnny Mathis) is also known for recording “Without Us”, the theme song of Family Ties.

Early  life
June Deniece Chandler was born and raised in Gary, Indiana, United States.

She attended Morgan State University in Baltimore, Maryland, in the hopes of becoming a registered nurse and an anesthetist, but she dropped out after a year and a half. She recalled, "You have to be a good student to be in college, and I wasn't."

Career

Early years (late 1960s-1980)
Williams started performing while a college student, "a part-time job singing at a club, Casino Royal, and I liked it. It was a lot of fun." During those years, she also worked at a telephone company and as a ward clerk at the Chicago Mercy Hospital.

She recorded for The Toddlin' Town group of labels as Deniece Chandler. One of those early records, "I'm Walking Away", was released on Toddlin's subsidiary Lock Records in the late 1960s, is a favorite on England's Northern Soul scene. A brief spell in 1969 with Patti Hamilton's the Lovelites resulted in her lead on "I'm Not Like the Others", a track that was eventually released in 1999.

She became a backup vocalist for Stevie Wonder as part of "Wonderlove", lending her vocals on his albums Talking Book, Fulfillingness' First Finale, and Songs in the Key of Life. Williams also appeared on Syreeta Wright's 1974 album Stevie Wonder Presents: Syreeta, Minnie Riperton's 1974 album Perfect Angel and Roberta Flack's 1975 album Feel Like Makin' Love.

She left Wonder in 1975 to sign a deal with Columbia Records and Kalimba Productions. Kalimba was a production company started by Maurice White and Charles Stepney. Williams went on to work on her first studio album with both White and Stepney as its producers. Released in 1976 This Is Niecy rose to Nos. 3 and 33 on the Top R&B/Hip-Hop Albums and Billboard 200 charts. This Is Niecy has also been certified Gold in the United States by the RIAA and silver in the UK by the British Phonographic Industry. An album cut, "Free", got to nos. 1, 2 & 25 on the UK Singles, Billboard Hot R&B Songs and Hot 100charts respectively. Another single being "That's What Friends Are For" rose to No. 8 on the UK Singles chart.

A few months before the release of This Is Niecy, Charles Stepney died. White went on to solely produce Williams' second album, Song Bird, released in 1977. The album rose to No. 23 on the Billboard Top Soul Albums chart. The Daily Express noted that Songbird is "filled with gorgeous songs that showcase her four-octave range to full effect". John Rockwell of The New York Times also called the album "most appealing" and "refreshingly varied".
A song from the album called "Baby, Baby My Love's All for You", reached No. 13 on the Billboard Hot Soul Songs chart and No. 32 UK Singles chart.

Williams guested on Roberta Flack's 1977 album, Blue Lights in the Basement, and sang along with Maurice White on Weather Report's 1978 album, Mr. Gone.

Williams went on to issue a duet album with Johnny Mathis dubbed That's What Friends Are For in 1978 on Columbia for Kalimba Productions. The LP rose to No. 14 on the Billboard Top Soul Albums chart and No. 19 on the Billboard 200 chart. That album has also been certified Gold in the US by the RIAA. A song from the album called "Too Much, Too Little, Too Late" reached No. 1 on the Billboard Hot 100, Hot Soul Songs and Adult Contemporary Songs charts.

William's fourth studio recording, When Love Comes Calling was issued in 1979 by ARC Records (ARC), Maurice White's vanity label on Columbia. The album rose to No. 27 on the Billboard Top Soul Albums chart. A single from the album, "I've Got the Next Dance", rose to No. 1 on the Billboard Dance/Club Play chart.

Williams issued her follow-up album, My Melody, in 1981 on Columbia/ARC. The album rose to No. 13 on the Billboard Top Soul Albums chart. My Melody has been certified Gold in the US by the RIAA.
The single, "Silly", reached No. 11 on the Billboard Hot Soul Songs chart.

Williams issued her follow-up album, Niecy, in 1982 on Columbia/ARC. Niecy rose to No. 20 on the Billboard 200 and No. 5 on the Billboard Top Soul Albums charts.

People described the album as "upbeat, soulful and polished".

A cover of the Royalettes' "It's Gonna Take a Miracle" reached No. 1 on the Billboard Hot Soul Songs chart and No. 10 on the Billboard Hot 100 chart. Williams and Mathis collaborated once again to record "Without Us" the theme song of the sitcom Family Ties which debuted in September 1982.

In the Netherlands the album track "It's Your Conscience" had been released as a single. It climbed to No. 15 on the Dutch Top 40 charts.

During 1983 she released her seventh studio album, I'm So Proud, which got to No. 10 on the Billboard Top R&B Albums chart. I'm So Proud was also nominated for a Grammy in the Best R&B Vocal Performance, Female category. During 1984 Williams released her follow up album Let's Hear It for the Boy. The title track reached No. 1 on the Billboard Hot 100 and was featured on the soundtrack to Footloose. She later guested on Johnny Mathis' 1984 album A Special Part of Me, Stevie Wonder's 1985 LP, In Square Circle and James Taylor's 1985 album That's Why I'm Here.

Gospel period (1980-1987)
Although Williams had recorded one inspirational song on almost each of her mainstream albums, it was in 1980 that her musical career path began to change favoring Gospel music. Williams joined with friends Philip Bailey of Earth, Wind & Fire fame, Billy Davis and Marilyn McCoo to present a gospel show at The Roxy, a popular Los Angeles club: "Jesus at the Roxy". Williams later reported that "God did something miraculous. Over three hundred people were saved."  In 1985, at the 27th Annual Grammy Awards, Williams sang an a cappella version of her 1977 composition "God Is Amazing", a Gospel song, rather than her No. 1 song "Let's Hear It for the Boy", much to her record company's disdain.

During 1986, her first gospel studio album, So Glad I Know, was released on Sparrow Records, and got to No. 6 on the Billboard Top Christian Albums chart and was nominated for Best Gospel Performance, Female Grammy. "They Say", a duet with Sandi Patti, Williams won the Grammy Award for Best Gospel Vocal Performance by a Duo or Group, Choir or Chorus and for "I Surrender All", she won the Grammy Award for Best Soul Gospel Performance, Female.

R&B and Jazz (1987-2000)
During 1987 she released her tenth studio album, Water Under the Bridge, which rose to No. 39 on the Billboard Top R&B Albums chart. "Never Say Never" reached No. 6 on the Billboard Hot R&B Songs chart and No. 23 on the Billboard Dance Club Songs chart.

A year later she released her follow-up studio album, As Good As It Gets, which rose to No. 48 on the Billboard Top R&B Albums chart. "I Can't Wait" charted at No. 8 on the Billboard Hot R&B Songs chart. Another single, "This Is As Good As It Gets", rose to No. 29 on the Billboard Hot R&B Songs chart.

During 1989, she issued her second Gospel album Special Love.
That album reached No. 11 on the Billboard Top Christian Albums chart.

Williams went on to appear on Nancy Wilson's 1990 LP A Lady with a Song, George Duke's 1992 album Snapshot, Stevie Wonder's 1995 LP Conversation Peace and Spyro Gyra's 1995 album Love & Other Obsessions. During 1999 she released another Gospel album, This Is My Song, on Harmony Records. The album rose to No. 14 on the Billboard Top Gospel Albums chart. As well This Is My Song won a Grammy Award for Best Pop/Contemporary Gospel Album.

Recent (2000 - present)
In April 2007 she later released another studio album entitled Love, Niecy Style, produced by Philly Soul veteran Bobby Eli, on Shanachie Records. Love, Niecy Style rose to No. 41 on the Billboard R&B/Hip Hop Albums chart. On October 13, 2007, Williams performed in her hometown of Gary, Indiana at the re-opening of the historic Glen Theater. Williams was thereafter recognized by Indiana State Representative Vernon G. Smith as an Outstanding Hoosier.

In October 2007 Williams went on to issue a single called, "Grateful: The Rededication", with Wanda Vaughn of The Emotions and Sherree Brown. The single got to No. 40 on the Billboard Adult R&B Songs chart. 

On April 29, 2008, Williams announced that she was preparing a proposal to establish a program called KOP—Kids of Promise—in her hometown of Gary, Indiana. Williams said the program would include a center with classes and programs dedicated to education and the performing arts. On June 27, 2010, Williams performed "Silly" with Monica at the BET Awards. As well in June 2011, Williams featured on Unsung, TV One's musical biography show.

She later guested on Cliff Richard's 2011 album Soulicious.

In the fall of 2020 she released a new single called "When You Love Somebody". This was followed by a new EP titled Gemini, released in the fall of 2021.

Filmography 
Williams went on to appear in the 2003 holiday movie Christmas Child. During December 2005 she appeared on the reality-dating show Elimidate as part of their "Celebrity Week".

Vocal profile 
Deniece Williams has a four-octave range and distinctive soprano voice. Her vocal range was also pointed out by The New York Times, "Miss Williams mounted a spectacular vocal display in which her penetrating, feline soprano soared effortlessly to E flat above high C, and she worked various vowel sounds into prolonged feats of vocal gymnastics." In pointing to Williams's similar vocal ability as her former musical icon and colleague (Minnie Riperton), Mark Anthony Neal, in referencing Jill Scott's agility in displaying vocal acrobatics, states, "Scott draws on her upper register recalling the artistry of the late Minnie Riperton and "songbird" Deniece Williams." According to Monica Haynes of Post-Gazette.com, Williams "has the kind of range that would make Mariah Carey quiver".

Personal life
Williams has been married three times and has four sons. Williams was married to her middle school sweetheart Kendrick Williams from 1971 until 1975, before she relocated to California in the early 1970s. She has since continued to use her first husband's surname professionally.Together they had two sons, Kendrick Jr. (b. 1972) and Kevin (b. 1973). In May 1981, Williams married actor and minister Christipher Joy. Williams and Joy separated in August 1982, divorcing later that year. From 1986 until 1993, Williams was married to Brad Westering, with whom she had two sons: Forrest (b. 1988) and Logan.

Discography

Grammy Awards 
The Grammy Awards are awarded annually by the National Academy of Recording Arts and Sciences. Williams has received four awards out of thirteen nominations.

See also 
 List of number-one hits (United States)
 List of artists who reached number one on the Hot 100 (U.S.)
 List of number-one dance hits (United States)
 List of artists who reached number one on the U.S. Dance chart

References

External links 
 
 
 

1951 births
Living people
21st-century African-American women singers
20th-century African-American women singers
20th-century American women singers
20th-century American singers
21st-century American women singers
21st-century American singers
African-American Christians
African-American songwriters
American dance musicians
American disco singers
American expatriates in the United Kingdom
American gospel singers
American rhythm and blues musicians
American rhythm and blues singer-songwriters
American sopranos
American women record producers
Musicians from Gary, Indiana
Writers from Gary, Indiana
Record producers from Indiana
Singer-songwriters from Indiana
Atlantic Records artists
Columbia Records artists
MCA Records artists
Shanachie Records artists
Sparrow Records artists
Grammy Award winners